24 Oras Ilokano, formerly Balitang Ilokano is a Philippine television news broadcasting program broadcast by GMA Network in the Ilocos Region. Anchored by Jorge Guerrero, it premiered on June 25, 2012. The newscast concluded on April 24, 2015.

Overview
The program delivers news and current events coming from the Ilocos provinces and Abra. It is initially aired live weekdays from GMA Ilocos studios in San Vicente, Ilocos Sur and was simulcasted on TV-5 Ilocos Norte and TV-7 Abra.

Premiered on June 25, 2012, the newscast began its airing weeks after the launch of GMA Ilocos. Former Balitang Amianan anchor Jorge Guerrero returned to his hometown in Ilocos just to anchor the said news program.

Following the changes on its now-main newscast 24 Oras, Balitang Ilokano was rebranded as 24 Oras Ilokano since November 10, 2014.

The newscast, suddenly got cancelled after almost three years of broadcast (next to GMA Bicol's 24 Oras Bikol, formerly Baretang Bikol, which aired three months later in September 2012) due to the strategic streamlining happened to all provincial stations of the network. Following the cancellation was the retrenchment of its staff and personalities and the closure of the network's regional news department.

Area of Coverage
Laoag City and Ilocos Norte
Vigan City and Ilocos Sur
Bangued and Abra
Batac
Candon City

Final Anchor
Jorge Guerrero

Final Reporters
Brigette Mayor - relief anchor for Jorge Guerrero; now a lawyer
Argie Lorenzo - relief anchor for Jorge Guerrero; now with GMA Dagupan and now with 103.7 Joy FM Abra
Zion Palacay - now working at Mariano Marcos State University
Mark Masudog - now working at the OCD Region 1
Manny Morales - now a Barangay Kagawad in Laoag City

Former Reporters
Ivy Hernando - now with GMA Dagupan
Zenna Nacino
Franzes Ivy Carasi - now working as Public & Media Relations Officer at Civil Defense Cordillera

References

GMA Network news shows
GMA Integrated News and Public Affairs shows
Philippine television news shows
2012 Philippine television series debuts
2015 Philippine television series endings
Mass media in Ilocos Sur
Flagship evening news shows